The Tiruchirappalli–Mayiladuthurai Express (via Kumbakonam) is a train which runs from Trichy to Mayiladuthurai in Tamil Nadu, India. This train is operated and the rakes are owned by South Western Railway. The train has numbered as (16233/16234) in both directions.

General information
This train was run between Tiruchchirappalli Jn to Mayiladuthurai Jn. When it completes its drive from Mysuru–Mayiladuthurai Express. The train starts from Mayiladuthurai Jn at 8.15 hrs and reaches Tiruchchirappalli Jn at 10.40 hrs. In return direction the train originates from Tiruchchirappalli Junction at 12.50 hrs and reaches Mayiladuthurai Junction at 15.15 hrs. This train is more useful for people those who are travelling from Tiruchchirappalli Jn, Thanjavur Jn, Papanasam, Kumbakonam, Aduthurai, Kutralam and Mayiladuthurai Jn. These trains originates from both sides on Everyday.

Schedule

Rakes

Rakes Sharing
Mysore-Mayiladuthurai Express & Mysore-Tuticorin Express

See also 
 Cholan Express
 Vaigai Superfast Express
 Rockfort Superfast Express
 Tiruchirappalli–Tirunelveli Intercity Express
 Mayiladuthurai–Mysore Express
 Pallavan Superfast Express
 Vasco da Gama–Velankanni Weekly Express

References

External links

 Southern Railway

Rail transport in Tiruchirappalli
Express trains in India
Rail transport in Tamil Nadu